Steve Tunga Malanda (born 8 March 1997) is a German professional footballer who plays as a midfielder for Wattenscheid.

Career
Tunga played youth football for Essener SG and VfL Bochum.

After playing for Rot-Weiß Oberhausen as well as Wattenscheid in the German fourth division, Tunga was offered the chance to train and play friendlies for German Bundesliga side Borussia Dortmund through former Rot-Weiß Oberhausen head coach Mike Tullberg, eventually signing for the club, where he failed to make an appearance.

In 2020, he signed for Almere City in the Dutch second division. After the 2021–22 season, Tunga's contract was not extended by Almere City, and he left the club as a free agent.

Personal life
Born in Germany, Tunga is of Angolan descent.

References

External links
 
 

German footballers
Living people
Association football midfielders
1997 births
Regionalliga players
Eerste Divisie players
German expatriate footballers
German expatriate sportspeople in the Netherlands
Expatriate footballers in the Netherlands
Rot-Weiß Oberhausen players
SG Wattenscheid 09 players
Borussia Dortmund II players
Almere City FC players
German people of Angolan descent
Footballers from Essen